is a Japanese footballer who plays as a midfielder.

He was educated at and played for Withus Navi High School & Osaka Gakuin University before moving to Singapore in 2015.  He extended his contract in 2015 to play for 2016 after a successful 2015 season.

Club career statistics
As of January 2, 2016

References

External links
https://us.soccerway.com/players/rui-kumada/398469/

1992 births
Living people
Japanese footballers
Japanese expatriate footballers
Expatriate footballers in Singapore
Singapore Premier League players
Albirex Niigata Singapore FC players
Association football forwards
Japanese expatriate sportspeople in Singapore
Sportspeople from Osaka Prefecture
21st-century Japanese people